The Adventures of Don Coyote and Sancho Panda is a 1990 animated television series produced by Hanna-Barbera with the Italian public service broadcaster RAI and its first channel, Rai 1. The series is loosely based on the characters Don Quixote and Sancho Panza from the 17th century novel by Cervantes.

Plot
Don Coyote (voiced by Frank Welker) is a swordsman who travels the land in search of adventure, with the help of his noble horse Rosinante (voiced by Brad Garrett), Sancho Panda (voiced by Don Messick) and his cynical donkey, Dapple (voiced by Don Messick). These crusaders of chivalry ride the countryside fighting for truth, justice, and beauty. Their attempts to do so are complicated by Don Coyote's state of mental unbalance and constantly mistaking everyday objects for horrific monsters. Coyote is always successful, for accidental reasons.

Broadcast
It was first aired in 1989 in Europe, and then in the United States in 1990 as part of the weekend/weekday morning programming block The Funtastic World of Hanna-Barbera.

Episodes

Season 1: 1990

Season 2: 1991

References

External links
 
 

1990 American television series debuts
1991 American television series endings
1990s American animated television series
American children's animated adventure television series
American children's animated comedy television series
American children's animated fantasy television series
Italian children's animated adventure television series
Italian children's animated comedy television series
Italian children's animated fantasy television series
English-language television shows
First-run syndicated television programs in the United States
The Funtastic World of Hanna-Barbera
Television series by Hanna-Barbera
Works based on Don Quixote
Television series about pandas